Selenium sulfide can refer to either of the following:

Selenium disulfide, SeS2
Selenium hexasulfide, Se2S6